The following lists events that happened during 1987 in New Zealand.

Population
 Estimated population as of 31 December: 3,342,100
 Increase since 31 December 1986: 28,600 (0.86%)
 Males per 100 Females: 97.9

Incumbents

Regal and viceregal
Head of State – Elizabeth II
Governor-General – The Rt Revd. Sir Paul Reeves GCMG GCVO QSO

Government
The 41st New Zealand Parliament, led by the Labour Party, concluded, and in the general election the party was re-elected in the 42nd New Zealand Parliament. The election also saw the elimination of the Democratic Party (formerly known as the Social Credit Party) from Parliament, leaving Labour and National as the only parties with representation.

Speaker of the House – Gerard Wall then Kerry Burke
Prime Minister – David Lange
Deputy Prime Minister – Geoffrey Palmer
Minister of Finance – Roger Douglas
Minister of Foreign Affairs – David Lange then Russell Marshall
Chief Justice — Sir Ronald Davison

Parliamentary opposition
 Leader of the Opposition –  Jim Bolger (National).

Main centre leaders
Mayor of Auckland – Catherine Tizard
Mayor of Hamilton – Ross Jansen
Mayor of Wellington – Jim Belich
Mayor of Christchurch – Hamish Hay
Mayor of Dunedin – Cliff Skeggs

Events 
 January, February: Māori loan affair continues.
2 March – Edgecumbe earthquake in the Bay of Plenty.
22 May–20 June: Inaugural Rugby World Cup hosted by both New Zealand and Australia, and won by New Zealand.
June–  The New Zealand Nuclear Free Zone, Disarmament, and Arms Control Act is passed.
 19 June – 6-year-old Teresa Cormack murdered.
July – The Māori Language Act makes Māori an official language.
1 August – The first Lotto draw.
15 August – The 1987 general election is held.
August – Telecom launches New Zealand's first mobile phone network.
20 October – The New Zealand stock market crashes following Black Monday on Wall Street. Share prices fell by 59 percent over four months.
3 November – McDonald's opens its first restaurants in the South Island at Linwood and Merivale, Christchurch.
December– New Zealand's first heart transplant takes place at Greenlane Hospital, for Brian Lindsay.

Arts and literature
Robert Lord wins the Robert Burns Fellowship.

See 1987 in art, 1987 in literature, :Category:1987 books

Music

New Zealand Music Awards
Winners are shown first with nominees underneath.
ALBUM OF THE YEAR  Herbs – Sensitive to a Smile
Dave Dobbyn – Footrot Flats
Ardijah – Ardijah
SINGLE OF THE YEAR  Dave Dobbyn – You Oughta Be in Love
Shona Laing – Glad I'm Not A Kennedy
The Chills – Leather Jacket
BEST MALE VOCALIST  Dave Dobbyn
Charles Tumahai (Herbs)
Martin Phillips (The Chills)
BEST FEMALE VOCALIST  Shona Laing
Betty-Anne Monga (Ardijah)
Patsy Riggir
BEST GROUP  The Chills
Ardijah
Herbs
MOST PROMISING MALE VOCALIST  Al Hunter
Wayne Elliot (Knightshade)
David Parker (Rhythm Cage)
MOST PROMISING FEMALE VOCALIST  Moana Maniapoto Jackson Moana and the Moahunters
Darlene Adair
Kara Pewhairangi
MOST PROMISING GROUP  Bonga And Harwood
Rhythm Cage
Knightshade
INTERNATIONAL ACHIEVEMENT  Neil Finn
Dave Dobbyn
The Chills
Shona Laing
Kiri Te Kanawa
BEST VIDEO  Matt Box Films – Sensitive to a Smile (Herbs)
Kerry Brown/ Bruce Sheridan – Glad Im Not A Kennedy (Shona Laing)
Paul Middleditch – The Game of Love (Tex Pistol)
BEST FILM SOUNDTRACK  Dave Dobbyn – Footrot Flats
Various Artists – Queen City Rocker
BEST PRODUCER  Dave Dobbyn – Footrot Flats
Billy Kristian – Sensitive to a Smile (Herbs)
Ian Morris – The Game of Love (Tex Pistol)
BEST ENGINEER  Ian Morris – The Game of Love (Tex Pistol)
Roland Morris / Nick Morgan – Ardijah
Doug Rogers / Rhys Moody – Brand New Doll
Tim Field – Out for the Count
BEST JAZZ ALBUM  Mike Nock / Frank Gibson, Jr. – 'Open Door'
Brian Smith – Brian Smith
The Umbrellas – The Umbrellas
BEST CLASSICAL ALBUM  Gillian Weir – Music to the Sun King
NZ Symphony Orchestra – Music By Douglas Lilburn
Margaret Neilson – Sea Changes
BEST COUNTRY ALBUM  Al Hunter – Neon Cowboy
Jodi Vaughan – Straight From The Heart
Patsy Riggir – Close To Thee
BEST FOLK ALBUM  Beverly Young – Bushes & Briar
Phil Garland – Hunger in the Air
Paul Mesters – Pacific Pilgrim
BEST GOSPEL ALBUM  Jules Riding – Heart Strings
Patsy Riggir – Close To Thee
Darlene Adair – Darlene Adair
BEST POLYNESIAN ALBUM  Herbs – E Papa – Jah Knows
Kahurangi – Kahurangi
Moana – Kua Makona
BEST CAST ALBUM  Stewart Macpherson – Pirates of Penzance
Philip Norman – Love Off The Shelf
Thomas Baker – The Conductor's Shoes
BEST SONGWRITER  Charles Tumahai/ Dilworth Karaka – Sensitive to a Smile (Herbs)
Dave Dobbyn – You Oughta Be in Love
Shona Laing – Glad Im Not A Kennedy
BEST COVER  Philip Trusttum – Songdance (Mike Herron)
Peter Bennett – Elephunkin
Reston Griffiths – Footrot Flats

See: 1987 in music

Performing arts

 Benny Award presented by the Variety Artists Club of New Zealand to Silvio De Pra.

Radio and television
See: 1987 in New Zealand television, 1987 in television, List of TVNZ television programming, :Category:Television in New Zealand, TV3 (New Zealand), :Category:New Zealand television shows, Public broadcasting in New Zealand

 Auckland Radio 1ZB becomes Newstalk 1ZB creating the first Newstalk ZB station.
 1ZM Auckland becomes Classic Hits 1251 creating the first Classic Hits station, other New Zealand radio stations do not take the Classic Hits branding until 1993/94.
 18 July: British children's television series Thomas the Tank Engine and Friends makes its debut on Network 2.

Film
Bad Taste
Ngati
Starlight Hotel

See: :Category:1987 film awards, 1987 in film, List of New Zealand feature films, Cinema of New Zealand, :Category:1987 films

Internet
See: NZ Internet History

Sport

Rugby
 The All Blacks win the inaugural Rugby World Cup.

Athletics
 Peter Renner wins his first national title in the men's marathon, clocking 2:15:32 on 22 November in Wiri, while Jillian Costley claims her first in the women's championship (2:39:33).

Harness racing
 New Zealand Trotting Cup: Lightning Blue
 The Auckland Trotting Cup was run twice in 1987 as it was being rescheduled from January back to December.
 January (2700m): Master Mood
 December (3200m): Luxury Liner

Shooting
Ballinger Belt – Diane Collings (Te Puke)

Soccer
 The Chatham Cup is won by Gisborne City who beat Christchurch United 7-3 on aggregate in a two-leg final.

Births
 7 January: Michael McGlinchey, football player
 27 January: Ben Te'o, rugby league player
 28 January: Steven O'Dor, football player
 13 February: Frank-Paul Nu'uausala, rugby league player
 18 February: Maria Tutaia, netball player
 22 February: Lesley Cantwell, race walker
 3 March: Jacob Spoonley, football player
 17 March: Krisnan Inu, rugby league player
 18 March: Clarissa Eshuis, hockey player
 20 March: David Richardson, actor
 27 March: Victor Vito, rugby union player
 7 April: Jaimee Kaire-Gataulu, actor
 10 April: Hayley Westenra, soprano
 11 April: Joseph Sullivan, rower Olympic gold medallist (2012 Summer Olympics 2012 London)
 29 April: Tim Winitana, rugby league player
 6 May: Katrina Grant, netball player
 29 May: Issac Luke, rugby league player
 7 June: Daniel Logan, actor
 4 July: Chris James, football player
 8 July: Alana Barber, race walker
 22 July: Sam Bewley, racing cyclist
 1 September: Dann Hume, singer-songwriter, drummer, and producer 
 16 September: Rongo Brightwell, singer
 2 October: Anita Punt, hockey player
 7 October: Jeremy Brockie, football player
 10 October: Colin Slade, rugby union player
 30 November: Miguel Start, rugby league player
 9 December: Polly Powrie, sailor, Olympic gold medallist (2012 Summer Olympics 2012 London)
 14 December: Lauren Boyle, swimmer
 23 December: Owen Franks, rugby union player All Black (2009–)
:Category:1987 births.

Deaths
 16 January Colin Scrimgeour, minister and broadcaster.
 13 February: Curly Page, cricketer.
 29 May: Bryan Todd, businessman (born 1902)
 31 May: Wilfrid Mervyn Lusty, journalist, drama critic, theatre administrator and adult educationalist
 16 July: Harry Ayres, guide and mountaineer.
 4 August: Cecil Burke, cricketer.
 14 October: John Rangihau, academic and leader of Tuhoe iwi.
 27 December: Rewi Alley, writer and member of the Communist Party of China.
 Alfred E. Allen, politician.
 Johnnie Hoskins, motorcycle speedway pioneer.
 Norman Jones, politician.
 Colin McCahon, artist.
 Denis Rogers, mayor of Hamilton.

See also
List of years in New Zealand
Timeline of New Zealand history
History of New Zealand
Military history of New Zealand
Timeline of the New Zealand environment
Timeline of New Zealand's links with Antarctica

References

External links

 
New Zealand
Years of the 20th century in New Zealand